Sonic Animation (stylised as sonicanimation) are an Australian dance and techno musical group which was formed by Adrian Cartwright on keyboards, drums and programming and Rupert Keiller on lead vocals and programming in 1994. The group disbanded in 2006 and then reformed in 2011. Altogether, they have released five studio albums, Silence Is Deafening (May 1997), Orchid for the Afterworld (October 1999), Reality by Deception (2002), Defective Perspective (2004) and Once More from the Bottom (March 2013).

History

1994–1998: Formation and Silence Is Deafening
Sonic Animation were formed in Melbourne by Steve Bertschik as a DJ, Adrian Cartwright on drums, keyboards and programming and Canadian-born Rupert Keiller on lead vocals and programming in 1994. Cartwright on drums and Keiller on vocals were both members of Scarlet Garden, a rock group formed in the early 1990s in Geelong. The pair had met as employees at a local graphic design business.

Cartwright recalled "I absolutely hated dance music ... But Rupert took me to a rave, and that was it for me. I'd always thought that dance music was so minimalist and easy, but when you get into it it's actually quite intricate and complex. I loved that. And then when we heard what Underworld were doing with vocals, we wanted to do that, too." In 1995 Sonic Animation released their debut single, "Time Is an Illusion", on a self-funded independent label. They followed with "From Sand to Stars", Zero Zero Zero Zero One and Force Feed.

Their debut studio album, Silence Is Deafening, was issued on Azwan Transmissions in May 1997. All the tracks were written, produced and engineered by Sonic Animation. At that time they were using a 386 computer for programming. In March 2002 Keiller recalled how "people would yell out 'nice one 386!', cos you know, we didn't really do anything, it was all just the computer. There are still some people that hold that view but we don't see it as much because of the kind of shows we play these, days." Bertschik left the group in 1998 to "pursue his own musical interests." The band signed with a new label: Global Recordings / Festival / FIIDO.

1999–2005: Commercial success
In January 1999 the group issued a single, "Love Lies Bleeding", which reached the ARIA Singles Chart top 50. Jasper Lee of Oz Music Project felt that it "builds up into full blown dance goodness with no doubt an anthem to club culture with the main vocal". Its lyrics contain a reference to illegal drugs, "I feel ecstasy". This initially concerned Keiller "I used to be worried about that sort of stuff — I don't know why — but nothing so far has happened." "Theophilus Thistler" was released as a single in August 1999, which received high rotation on national radio station, Triple J, its popularity was assisted by the track's associated music video. The video featured their two mascots, or TechoTubbies, dubbed Robert Roley and Theophilus Thistler. At live performances the mascots' suits are worn by two fans selected by the band via their web site. "Theophilus Thistler" appeared on the ARIA Singles Chart top 100 and was listed at No. 18 on the Triple J Hottest 100, 1999, in a listeners poll.

The group's second studio album, Orchid for the Afterworld, was issued on 11 October 1999 on Global Records which peaked at No. 42 on the ARIA Albums Chart. In 2005 the album was certified gold for shipment of 35,000 copies by ARIA. Lee attended their gig in April 2000 at Macquarie University, he noticed "a weird mix of a rave and a mosh, with those up the front of the crowd firmly squashed in against the foldback speakers. Nonetheless everyone was having a great time, and enjoyed what Sonic Animation had to offer."

Sonic Animation's third studio album, Reality by Deception, was released on 4 February 2002, which peaked at No. 22 on the ARIA Albums Chart and No. 6 on the ARIA Dance chart. Lee felt the album "pares back the more commercially-friendly vocals... in favour of more straight trance-light tracks more akin to their clubbing roots... [They] have flowed with a different aim in mind that has seen a decent, although not terribly inspiring release." It provided the singles, "E-Ville" (October 2001), "I'm a DJ" (February 2002) and "Super Showbiz Star" (April 2002). "I'm a DJ" was listed at No. 74 on the Triple J Hottest 100, 2002.

Sonic Animation's fourth studio album, Defective Perspective was released on 9 February 2004, which provided the singles, "This Is not a Love Poem" and "Get Up". "This Is not a Love Poem" was based on lyrics by Philip Norton. Leasa de Klerk of InTheMix felt that the two CDs provided a "sheer variety of styles and sounds that are on the album. The guys are really showing their flexibility in their  offering."

Sonic Animation announced their break-up in mid-2005 with the release of compilation album, Eleven (September 2005), which appeared on the ARIA Dance Albums Chart top 25. It was followed by the Bugger Off tour. They made their last festival appearance at the Big Day Out in 2006 (Australian shows only).

2011–present: reformation and  Once More from the Bottom
In 2011 Cartwright and Keiller revealed a new Sonic Animation remix for world music outfit, Delhi 2 Dublin. They announced that they were back in the studio recording their next album.

In March 2013, after an almost six-year hiatus, Sonic Animation released their fifth studio album, Once More from the Bottom. Adam Barbuto of Reverb noticed that "you get the feeling the lads from Sonic Animation have thrown their all into these songs and take this comeback super seriously. To somewhat refute any lack of confidence buyers may have had in the naming of the album, Once More from the Bottom, I can safely say SonicAnimation are anywhere near it. In fact I’d say they are back on track and heading for those big city lights." Rip It Up!s Simone Keenan felt that "Although there’s plenty of odd-ball tracks ... there is some quality too like the hip hop/dubstep 'Punk on the Dance Floor' (which sounds better than the title may suggest) and 'Take It from Me' which features guest vocals from Canadian songstress Sexton Blake. Dub, techno, funk, house... You’ll find all of it on here." The album provided the single, "I Will Be Twisted"; its music video was created with fan-submitted footage taken on cell phones at the 2012 Homebake festival.

Members
Sonic animation are:
 Adrian Cartwright
 Rupert Keiller

with:

 Steve Bertschik (circa 1994–1998)
 Mark Saul (circa 1999–2001)
 Richard Falkner (circa 2002–2004)
 Erica Mclean (circa 2004–2006)
 Sexton Blake aka Nadine Tremblay (circa 2012–2013)

Discography

Albums

Compilation albums

Extended plays

Singles

Awards

ARIA Music Awards
The ARIA Music Awards is an annual awards ceremony that recognises excellence, innovation, and achievement across all genres of Australian music. Sonic Animation has been nominated for three awards.

|-
| 1999
| "Love Lies Bleeding"
| Best Dance Release
| 
|-
| rowspan="2"| 2000
| rowspan="2"| Orchid for the Afterworld
| Best Dance Release
| 
|-
| ARIA Award for Breakthrough Artist – Album
| 
|-

References

Australian electronic musicians
Australian techno groups
Musical groups established in 1997
Musical groups disestablished in 2005
Musical groups from Melbourne